Adelaide Plains wine region is a wine region located in South Australia immediately north of the capital city of Adelaide.   The region received appellation as an Australian Geographical Indication in 2002 and as of 2014, it is represented by 11 wineries. It is part of the Mount Lofty Ranges zone.

Extent and appellation
The Adelaide Plains wine region covers an area located in the northern end of the  Adelaide metropolitan area and rural land to the metropolitan area's immediate north.  Its northern boundary starts at the mouth of the Light River on the coast with Gulf St Vincent and follows the river's alignment until about due east of Mallala where it follows the alignment of Wasleys Road passing through Wasleys  until it meets the Horrocks Highway being the name of the section of the Main North Road located north of Gawler.

Its eastern boundary follows the alignment of the Main North Road to its intersection with the Grand Junction Road and the Princes Highway at Gepps Cross in the south passing through Roseworthy, Gawler and Elizabeth.  Its southern boundary is the Grand Junction Road and the continuation of its alignment along Bower Road to the coastline.  Its western boundary is the Gulf St Vincent coastline including crossing over the Port River and the Barker Inlet from Outer Harbor to St Kilda.

The Adelaide Plains wine region was registered as an Australian Geographical Indication on 25 March 2002.

Grapes and wine
The 2014 vintage is reported as consisting of  red grapes crushed valued at A$2,523,461 and  white grapes crushed valued at $737,939. As of 2014, the region is reported as containing at least 11 wineries.

See also

South Australian wine

Citations and references

Citations

References

Wine regions of South Australia